Hamengkubuwono VIII (3 March 1880 – 22 October 1939), also spelled as Hamengkubuwana VIII, was the 8th sultan of Yogyakarta, reigning from 1921 until his death in 1939. During his reign, he carried out the rehabilitation of the Kraton Ngayogyakarta Hadiningrat building, as well as a number of other structures. He was also one of the first to support Kyai Haji Ahmad Dahlan in the formation of the Muhammadiyah organization.

Early life and education

Early life 
Hamengkubuwono VIII, born as Gusti Raden Mas Sujadi, was born on March 3, 1880. His father was the Sultan of Yogyakarta, Hamengkubuwono VII, while his mother was the first queen consort styled as Gusti Kanjeng Ratu Hemas or Her Highness Queen Hemas in English.

Reign

Infrastructure 
During the leadership of Hamengkubuwono VIII, Yogyakarta experienced rapid progress in the fields of education and health. In the field of architecture, the sultan overhauled the current physical form of the palace.

Culture 
In the field of culture, a number of dances were created during his leadership, including the Srimpi dance. It was also at this time that the standardization of classical Yogyakarta style dance standards began.

Appointment of heir 
In 1939, he recalled his son, Raden Mas Dorodjatun (later known as Hamengkubuwono IX), who was studying in the Netherlands. In Batavia, the Sultan handed over the kris of Kyai Ageng Joko Piturun to Gusti Raden Mas Dorojatun as a sign of royal succession, as well as a sign that it was Gusti Raden Mas Dorojatun who would later succeed as Sultan.

Death and grave 
He died on 22 October 1939, at Panti Rapih Hospital, Yogyakarta. He is buried in Astana Saptarengga, Pajimatan Imogiri.

References

External links

Sultans of Yogyakarta
Burials at Imogiri
1880 births
1939 deaths
Indonesian royalty
Knights Grand Cross of the Royal Order of Cambodia